Kappa Tauri (κ Tau, κ Tauri) is a double star in the constellation Taurus, the two components κ1 Tauri and κ2 Tauri both members of the Hyades open cluster. The pair are approximately 150 light years from Earth and are separated from each other by about six light years.

System

The system is dominated by a visual double star, κ1 Tauri and κ2 Tauri.  κ1 Tauri is a white A-type subgiant with an apparent magnitude of +4.22. It is emitting an excess of infrared radiation at a temperature indicating there is a circumstellar disk in orbit at a radius of 67 AU from the star. κ2 Tauri is a white A-type main sequence star with an apparent magnitude of +5.24.

Between the two bright stars is a binary star made up of two 9th magnitude stars, Kappa Tauri C and Kappa Tauri D, which are 5.5 arcseconds from each other (as of 2013) and 175.1 arcseconds from κ1 Tau. Two more 12th magnitude companions fill out the visual group: Kappa Tauri E, which is 145 arcseconds from κ1 Tau, and Kappa Tauri F, 108.5 arcseconds away from κ2 Tau.

The bright pair are both members of the Hyades star cluster, while the fainter stars are all much more distant background stars.

Test of General Relativity

Kappa Tauri was photographed during the solar eclipse of May 29, 1919 by the expedition of Arthur Eddington in Príncipe and others in Sobral, Brazil that confirmed Albert Einstein's prediction of the bending of light around the Sun from his general theory of relativity which he published in 1915.

Naming
With φ, υ and χ, it composed the Arabic were the Arabs' Al Kalbain, the Two Dogs. According to the catalogue of stars in the Technical Memorandum 33-507 - A Reduced Star Catalog Containing 537 Named Stars, Al Kalbain were the title for five stars : φ as Alkalbain I, χ as Alkalbain II, these stars (κ2 and κ1) are Alkalbain III and Alkalbain IV, and υ as Alkalbain V.

References

Tauri, Kappa
Taurus (constellation)
6
A-type subgiants
A-type main-sequence stars
Hyades (star cluster)
Tauri, 65
027934/46
020635/41
1387/8
BD+21 0642
Double stars